Wooden buildings which have exceptional heights are in this article listed, starting with the highest wooden structures.

The tallest ever wooden structure was the tower of Mühlacker radio transmitter (destroyed in 1945). However according to some sources  wooden radio masts with heights of 220 metres were realized in Russia, but no data are available when and where these structures were realized. The tallest standing wooden structure is Gliwice Radio Tower.

In a narrower sense these structures are not buildings. The tallest building has been the Sanctuary of Truth, a  temple in Pattaya, Thailand. The previous record holder, the  Pagoda of Fogong Temple, was built 900 years ago.

See also 
 List of tallest buildings and structures
 List of tallest structures
 List of tallest church buildings
 List of tallest Orthodox churches
 List of tallest domes
 List of tallest mosques
 List of tallest crosses

References

Wooden
Wooden buildings and structures

de:Holzturm